John Halliday  (c. 1709–1754) was a British politician who sat in the House of Commons in 1754.

Halliday was the eldest son  of John Halliday of Yard House and his wife Mary Trowbridge, daughter of Edmund Trowbridge of Lipyeate, Somerset. He married Mary Welman, daughter of Isaac Welman of Poundisford Park, Somerset in 1737. He was High Sheriff of Somerset in 1746-47

Halliday was returned unopposed for Taunton  at the 1754 general election.  He died a week after the new Parliament assembled on 8 June 1754, aged 44. He was succeeded by his son John who was also MP for Taunton.

References

1700s births
1754 deaths
British MPs 1754–1761
Members of the Parliament of Great Britain for English constituencies